Sein Tun (also spelt Sein Htoon) was a Burmese physicist, who taught at the Yangon University from 1994 until his retirement in 2006. He also authored teaching materials for advanced physics and was a member of the Science Council and a fellow at the Institute of Physics.

References

Burmese scientists
University of Yangon alumni
Alumni of the University of Surrey
Fellows of the Institute of Physics
1939 births
2011 deaths